Out-of-band control is a characteristic of network protocols with which data control is regulated. Out-of-band control passes control data on a separate connection from main data. Protocols such as FTP use out-of-band control. 

FTP sends its control information, which includes user identification, password, and put/get commands, on one connection, and sends data files on a separate parallel connection. Because it uses a separate connection for the control information, FTP uses out-of-band control.

See also
Out-of-band management
In-band control

Computer networks